Driver Historic District is a national historic district located at Suffolk, Virginia. The district encompasses 20 contributing buildings in the crossroads community of Driver in Suffolk.  The district includes eight residences, two churches, two school structures, a lodge, an outbuilding, and five commercial structures.  They are in a variety of popular 19th and early-20th century architectural styles including Federal, Queen Anne, and Colonial Revival.  Notable buildings include the Parker House (1820-1840), Norfolk and Carolina Railroad depot and station master's house (c. 1890), Brannon House (c. 1892), Arthur's Store (c. 1925), Randy's Rods, Driver Variety Store, Beech Grove United Methodist Church, Berea Congregational Christian Church (c. 1891), Dejarnette High School (1926), and Harmony Lodge #149 (1938).

It was added to the National Register of Historic Places in 1995.

References

Historic districts on the National Register of Historic Places in Virginia
Federal architecture in Virginia
Queen Anne architecture in Virginia
Colonial Revival architecture in Virginia
Buildings and structures in Suffolk, Virginia
National Register of Historic Places in Suffolk, Virginia